The 1936 Hong Kong Urban Council election was supposed to be held on 13 January 1936 for the one of the two unofficial seats in the Urban Council of Hong Kong. It was supposed to be the first election after the Sanitary Board was reconstituted into the Urban Council.

Dr. Chau Sik-nin, who later became the Senior Unofficial Member of the Executive and Legislative Council, was elected without being contested.

References
 Endacott, G. B. Government and people in Hong Kong, 1841-1962 : a constitutional history Hong Kong University Press. (1964) 
 The Hong Kong Government Gazette

Hong Kong
1936 in Hong Kong
Urban
Uncontested elections
January 1936 events
1936 elections in the British Empire